Black Zero is a name shared by two supervillains, two terrorist organizations, one special forces group, and a computer virus that have all appeared in various comic book series published by DC Comics.

Original Black Zero supervillain

Fictional character biography
The original Black Zero appeared Pre-Crisis in Superman #205 (1968), in a story entitled "The Man Who Destroyed Krypton" written by Otto Binder with artwork by Al Plastino. This Black Zero revealed to Superman that he was a space saboteur who destroyed planets. He had been hired to destroy Krypton, and discovered that the internal stresses which would have destroyed it in any case were dying down, necessitating his involvement to ensure it exploded.

In the present day, Black Zero came to Earth, threatening to destroy it as he did Krypton. In desperation, Superman released Jax-Ur, a prisoner of the Phantom Zone, who wished to avenge Krypton's destruction. As he launched a devastatingly powerful missile toward Earth, Black Zero attacked Jax-Ur with a red kryptonite bullet, causing his body to mutate wildly into several serpent-like forms. This proved to be Black Zero's undoing; while Superman saved the Earth from the missile, Jax-Ur transformed into a Medusa-like form, turning Black Zero to stone with his gaze. Black Zero's body was then shattered by Jax-Ur, in recompense for what he had done to Krypton.
 
This story suggests that, were it not for something none of them knew, Jor-El would have been wrong and the Science Council right. E. Nelson Bridwell hypothesized that what Black Zero had noticed was the Green Lantern Tomar Re's attempts to prevent the destruction (as seen in Superman #257 (1972)), meaning the two sets of interference canceled each other out, and Jor-El was right after all.

Power and abilities
Black Zero had the ability to create "psycho-molecules" with his mind, which he could then shape into any form of matter he chose. His brain had been fitted with a plastic coating, preventing him from being hypnotised. He could make his body intangible, enabling him to pass through solid objects. He was a skilled engineer, able to create weapons and devices that could destroy entire planets. He was also skilled in the art of disguise.

Black Zero organizations
The first Post-Crisis version of Black Zero appeared in the 1988 World of Krypton miniseries written by John Byrne and illustrated by Mike Mignola. Although later described as a "clone liberation movement" in Superboy (vol. 4) #61 Black Zero was described as a "terrorist" organization that was ultimately responsible for the destruction of Krypton. During the Third Age of Krypton, Kryptonians extended their lives by maintaining clones in suspended animation (the Clone Banks), which they then harvested for body parts. Trouble in Kryptonian society concerning this issue emerged after a prominent citizen named Nyra removed one of her clones from stasis to marry the clone to her own son. The enraged son after killing his clone fiancé, publicly confronted his mother and killed her as well, but was forcibly stopped from killing himself. After widespread public knowledge ensued concerning the fact that a clone had been able to achieve full sentience as a living being, a new Kryptonian war began. Prominently featured in this war was the Black Zero organization, which acted against this "genetic slavery"; this began the War of Clone Rights, which lasted for a thousand years. In their final act, Black Zero detonated a device that would later become known as the Destroyer. In essence, this device functioned as a giant nuclear gun, that fired a concentrated, sustained burst of nuclear energy directly into Krypton's core. Though subsequently destroyed by Van-L, an ancestor of Jor-El himself, the Destroyer's effect would later be fully realized; it causes a chain reaction deep within Krypton that would, thousands of years later, obliterate the planet.

A second Black Zero group appeared in the 2005 graphic novel Superman: Infinite City.

Most recently, the name "Black Zero" was used by an elite Kryptonian military force, under the command of Ursa. This unit included Thara Ak-Var's parents. The unit, except for Ursa, was killed attempting to defend Kandor from Brainiac.

The "Black Zero II" computer virus
The Black Zero virus appeared in Superman Plus/Legion of Super-Heroes #1, a 1997 one-shot teaming Superman with the Legion of Super-Heroes. An intelligent computer virus created by the terrorist group, Black Zero II was dormant in the Kryptonian technology used to create the Fortress of Solitude. After being inadvertently activated by Apparition, Black Zero II ran Superman and the Legion through a warped version of Kryptonian history, intending to finish with the destruction of Earth. It was halted when Brainiac 5 inadvertently caused a power outage, and subsequently removed the virus from the Fortress' computers.

Black Zero (Superboy)

The second Black Zero is a fictional character, a supervillain from the DC Comics universe. The character first appeared in Superboy (vol. 4) #61 as part of the '"Hypertension" storyline and was created by Karl Kesel and Tom Grummett.

Fictional character biography
Black Zero was an alternate version of Superboy from a reality in which Superman never returned from the dead after his battle with Doomsday. This reality mirrored the main continuity with Paul Westfield, the Executive Director of Project Cadmus, secretly using his own cellstock for his team of scientists to immediately create a human clone that would be genetically engineered to look like Superman with powers deriving from a telekinetic field. Instead of the Newsboy Legion clones releasing him prematurely, the clone went through the full artificial maturation process to match the age of the original and became the new Superman. However, he believed that he was perceived as a usurper and resented by the people for not being the original Superman. After a battle with his reality's versions of Brainiac, Maxima, and Metallo led to the deaths of Supergirl, Brainiac and 318 civilians, a public backlash began against the new Superman and other clones that the people dubbed "genetix"; this led to Congress demanding the shutdown of Project Cadmus with the Guardian and the original directors of Project Cadmus sans Westfield abandoning the project.

After the Guardian was killed by an anti-genetix mob, the new Superman retreated to the original Superman's Fortress of Solitude and sought guidance from Kryptonian history. When he learned of the Black Zero clone liberation movement from Krypton, he discarded the name of Superman and took Black Zero as his new name. He decided to defend genetix everywhere and stop the anti-clone lobby by any means necessary. Turning Project Cadmus into Fortress Cadmus and creating an army of Guardian clones known as Stormguards with no previous memories of the original Guardian, Black Zero began a war in which most of his Earth's heroes were destroyed and cloned as soldiers for Cadmus with extreme changes by his head geneticist Dabney Donovan.

After conquering his Earth, Black Zero became aware of the existence of other realities when he encountered the Challengers of the Unknown, who arrived to his homeworld from a dimensional doorway. Metron of the New Gods, who appeared shortly after the Challengers, struck an agreement with Black Zero and offered him the chance to enter Hypertime via the construction of a reactor powered by the element Hyperium. Black Zero "rescued" other worlds in which he felt that genetix were being oppressed and left the conquered world's version of Paul Westfield in charge of the genetix on that world. The Challengers attempted to stop him by launching commando raids against Black Zero and his forces and smuggling themselves to whatever world was next in his crusade. To Black Zero's bafflement, the Superboys of these worlds often stood against him, leading him to store them in stasis chambers similar to the clone banks of Krypton. A Superboy from another reality that Black Zero tried to conquer escaped with a stolen Hyperjacket from Fortress Cadmus, but was shot with a laser by the Paul Westfield of his reality resulting in fatal burns. He warned the Justice League of the main continuity of Black Zero's coming before he died. Learning that the deceased Superboy was a genetic match and using the Hyperjacket repaired by the Gadget Guru of the Hairies, the Superboy of the main continuity traveled to other worlds where he learned of Black Zero and eventually landed on an Earth in which Superboy was Kal-El.

After Superboy was in possession of the hyperjacket, Black Zero followed him to each world that he visited, capturing all of the versions of Superboy that Kon-El encountered. When he reached the world of the Kal-El Superboy, he captured Krypto and ambushed both Kon-El and Kal-El using his Stormguard forces and his own powers. Learning that Superboy wasn't the Superboy that stole the hyperjacket, Black Zero sent him to Fortress Cadmus and revealed his true identity and told his story to Superboy via the latter in a mnemonic chair that showed parts of Black Zero's life in virtual reality. He revealed his plans to take over Superboy's reality, which he used a supposed anti-clone sentiment as justification, and to use one of the Doomsdays that he collected from alternate realities against Superman. After revealing his plan, a reformed version of Knockout from the deceased Superboy's world attacked with the Challengers of The Unknown, posing as Stormguards, and went after her reality's Paul Westfield. Westfield leaped into the Hyperium reactor and unknowingly erased every Paul Westfield in existence as well as himself. Angry at the loss of Westfield, who he considered a father figure, Black Zero sent Superboy, Knockout, and the Challengers to the Doomsday chamber to be destroyed while he prepared to take over the next world. Superboy and the Challengers escaped with Knockout making the ultimate sacrifice against the Doomsdays.

Black Zero was eventually defeated by a combined effort from Superboy, the Challengers of the Unknown, and all the other Superboys imprisoned at Fortress Cadmus. After Metron sends the Superboys and Stormguards back to their own realities along with immobilizing Black Zero with a Mother Box, he provides a ship for the Challengers and Superboy to fly through the hyperium reactor and into a hyperstorm to return home. Superboy intended to take Black Zero to his homeworld to keep watch over him, but Black Zero attacks the ship with his tactile telekinesis. Superboy dives into the hyperstorm and is almost struck by it until Black Zero rescued Superboy and saves the Challengers except for Matthew "Red" Ryan. Superboy attempted to convince Black Zero that his mission was wrong and to give people a chance, but Black Zero is engulfed by hyperstorm energy and disappears before responding to Superboy.

After his "death", Black Zero became a reminder to Superboy as to what could happen if he ever went out of control. During a battle with Etrigan over an enchanted armored gauntlet known as "Hyssa's Fist", Superboy puts on the gauntlet and while his strength increased, his costume was transformed into an exact copy of Black Zero's costume with the S-shield on the gold harness. He quickly used his tactile telekinesis to disassemble the gauntlet from his right hand.

Powers, abilities, and equipment

Tactile telekinesis
Black Zero's main unique power is an advanced form of  "tactile telekinesis". Like Superboy, it is a telekinetic force field that surrounds his body and allows him to simulate superhuman speed, strength, flight and invulnerability. Tactile telekinesis also allows him to disassemble machines and other complex constructions by touch. Unlike Superboy, Black Zero's field provides him with resistance to energy attacks and he could use tactile telekinesis to telekinetically hold an opponent immobile.

Powers not derived from tactile telekinesis
As he explained to Superboy, Black Zero's human DNA was made to be genetically similar to that of Superman's DNA. Like Superboy, he is a living solar battery with his tactile telekinetic powers being fueled by solar energy. Grown to a full adult by the Project Cadmus of his reality, Black Zero gained powers similar to Superman due to his advanced age such as heat vision and super hearing.

With the combination of his tactile telekinesis and his simulated Kryptonian powers it is implied that Black Zero is more powerful than Superman. He easily seems to hold his own against multiple versions of Superboys, even the vastly powered Pre-Crisis Earth-1 version. Black Zero also seems to be well prepared to conquer a reality where he will have to fight Superman after his army of Doomsdays are disposed of.

Costumes and equipment
Black Zero wears a black costume with red accents offset by a red cape, red belt at the waist, gold harness with a black "0" on his chest, gold belt on the right leg, and a pair of black glasses. Additionally, he wears a "hypergun" on his right arm equipped with hyper-bullets which he can fire at his targets and instantly transport them via hypertravel directly to his stasis cells at Fortress Cadmus.

In other media

Television
 The Black Zero terrorist organization appears in the Smallville episode "Kandor". This version of the group is infamous for destroying the eponymous city.
 The Black Zero terrorist organization appears in the first season of Krypton. This version of the group is led by Jax-Ur. They join forces with General Zod, among other Kryptonians to foil Brainiac's plan to destroy Kandor until Zod betrays them, causing the group to disband.

Film
A Kryptonian prison frigate called the Black Zero appears in films set in the DC Extended Universe (DCEU).
 First appearing in Man of Steel, the Black Zero was designed by Jor-El to transport criminals to the Phantom Zone and was used to imprison General Zod and his battalion, the Sword of Rao. Following Krypton's destruction, the Sword of Rao repurposed the Black Zero as their command ship. They travel to Earth to retrieve the Growth Codex, but are defeated by Superman and sent back to the Phantom Zone.
 The Black Zero appears in a flashback in Batman v Superman: Dawn of Justice.
 The Black Zero will return in The Flash.

See also
Alternative versions of Superman
Comic book death
Project Cadmus
Superboy (Kon-El)
Superman

References

External links
 Supermanica entry on the Pre-Crisis Black Zero

Characters created by Karl Kesel
Characters created by Otto Binder
Characters created by John Byrne (comics)
Characters created by Mike Mignola
Comic book terrorist organizations
Comics characters introduced in 1968
Comics characters introduced in 1999
DC Comics supervillains
DC Comics male supervillains
DC Comics characters with superhuman senses
DC Comics characters with superhuman strength
DC Comics telekinetics
DC Comics metahumans
Fictional characters with absorption or parasitic abilities
Fictional characters with nuclear or radiation abilities
Fictional genetically engineered characters
Clone characters in comics
Fictional characters with energy-manipulation abilities
Fictional characters with fire or heat abilities
Fictional mass murderers
Kryptonians
Space pirates
Superboy
Superman characters
de:Superboy#Black Zero